General elections were held in the Netherlands on 13 June 1956. For the first time, the Labour Party (PvdA) emerged as the largest party, winning 50 of the 150 seats in the House of Representatives.

The elections led to the continuation of the four-party coalition government, consisting of the PvdA, Catholic People's Party, Anti-Revolutionary Party and Christian Historical Union.

Electoral system
Prior to the elections the number of seats in the House of Representatives was raised from 100 to 150. This meant that the electoral threshold was reduced from 1% to 0.67%.

Results

References

1956
1956 elections in the Netherlands
Netherlands